Mr. Rhythm is a 10-inch studio album by Frankie Laine, released in 1954 on Columbia Records. It was recorded with Paul Weston and his orchestra and Carl Fischer on the piano.

It was Laines' third album for Columbia, after One for My Baby (recorded in 1951) and A Musical Portrait of New Orleans (recorded in 1953 together with Jo Stafford).

The album was released in two formats: one 10-inch long-playing 33-rpm record and a set of four 7-inch 45-rpm records.

Track listing

References 

1954 albums
Frankie Laine albums
Columbia Records albums